The 2002 CAF Cup Final was the final of the 2002 CAF Cup. JS Kabylie of Algeria beat Tonnerre Yaoundé of Cameroon 4–1 on aggregate to win their third title in the competition, and their third in a row.

Route to the final

Match details

First Leg

Assistant referees:
Adjovi Hogue (Benin)
Awangui (Benin)

Second Leg

Assistant referees:
Taoufik Adjengui (Tunisia)
Taoufik Oueslati (Tunisia)

References

2002 CAF Cup
3
JS Kabylie matches
Tonnerre Yaoundé matches
2002–03 in Algerian football
2002 in Cameroonian football
November 2002 sports events in Africa